Bhavin Turakhia (born 21 December 1979)  is a serial entrepreneur, and the founder of Titan, Flock, Radix, CodeChef and Zeta. In 2016, Bhavin, a billionaire, was ranked as the 95th richest person in India, with a net worth of US$1.3 billion, along with his brother Divyank Turakhia, according to Forbes. He has been honored as a 2011 Young Global Leader by the World Economic Forum.

Early life 
Currently based in London, Bhavin was born in Mumbai in a middle class Jain family. He did his schooling from Arya Vidya Mandir, Bandra. He attended D.G. Ruparel College to study science and later dropped out and then completed his bachelor's degree in commerce from Sydenham College of Commerce and Economics.

Career 
In 1998 with a capital of ₹25,000 (equal to roughly US$675 in 1998), Bhavin Turakhia at the age of 18, started his first tech venture Directi with his brother Divyank Turakhia.

In 2014, Bhavin and Divyank sold four of their web presence companies – BigRock, LogicBoxes, ResellerClub, and Webhosting.info – to Nasdaq-listed U.S.-based web-hosting firm Endurance International Group, for $160 million.

He currently operates Titan, Flock, Radix and Zeta.
	
In July 2019, his banking tech venture Zeta received an investment from Sodexo at a valuation of $300 million.  In 2021, Zeta secured $250 millionh in investment from SoftBank Vision Fund 2. This Series C investment values Zeta at $1.45 billion.

In August 2021, Titan, the professional email service founded by Bhavin, received a $30 million investment from Automattic, valuing Titan at $300 million.

Awards and recognition 
 Ranked #95, with a net worth of US$1.3 billion, on the Forbes list of India's 100 Richest People (2016).
 Serial Entrepreneur of the Year and Entrepreneur of the Year in Innovation and Technology by Entrepreneur (2016).
 The ETPanache Trendsetter Award by The Economic Times (2016).
 Young Global Leader by the World Economic Forum (WEF) in Geneva (2011).
 Bharti Entrepreneur of the Year award by the Bharti Foundation & the Entrepreneurship Development Institute of India (2005).
 Chairperson of the Internet Corporation for Assigned Names and Numbers (ICANN)'s Registrar Constituency for several terms.

See also 

 Information Technology Act, 2000
 Legal aspects of computing
 List of Indian entrepreneurs
 List of Internet entrepreneurs

References

External links 

 
 Bhavin & Divyank Turakhia at Forbes
 Bhavin Turakhia's Interview at Businessworld
 How Turakhia duo spends the moolah! at Economic Times
 Bhavin Turakhia's interview at Forbes
 How Bhavin Turakhia is building a 'bank in a box' stack at Business Standard

1979 births
Gujarati people
Indian billionaires
Indian chief executives
Indian industrialists
Living people
University of Mumbai alumni
Businesspeople from Mumbai